Kingsport City Schools is a public school district that serves the residents of the city of Kingsport, Tennessee, USA. In November 2014, the district's schools had a combined enrollment of 7,100. Kingsport City Schools was named the 2014 SCORE District of the Year winner by the Tennessee State Collaborative on Reforming Education, which is an education reform organization started by the former U.S. Senator Bill Frist. Kingsport City Schools was named a SCORE Prize Finalist in 2013. Kingsport City Schools made the 2014 and 2015 College Board's 5th/6th Annual AP District Honor Roll listing (and is only one of ten districts in Tennessee named).

Schools

Pre-K schools
John Adams Elementary School
Andrew Jackson Elementary School
Andrew Johnson Elementary School
John F. Kennedy Elementary School
Abraham Lincoln Elementary School
Kingsport Child Development Center
Palmer Center
V.O. Dobbins Community Center

Elementary schools (K–5)
John Adams Elementary School
Andrew Jackson Elementary School
Thomas Jefferson Elementary School
Andrew Johnson Elementary School
John F. Kennedy Elementary School
Abraham Lincoln Elementary School
Theodore Roosevelt Elementary School
George Washington Elementary School

Middle schools (6–8)
Ross N. Robinson Middle School
John Sevier Middle School

High school (9–12)
Dobyns-Bennett High School
D-B EXCEL

References

External links
Kingsport City Schools website

School districts in Tennessee
Kingsport, Tennessee
Education in Sullivan County, Tennessee